Philippine Airlines Flight 215 was the route designator for a Philippine Airlines flight from Cauayan Airport to Manila International Airport which exploded en route to Manila.

Accident

The tail section separated from the aircraft and the aircraft crashed.

All 32 passengers and 4 crew (36 in total) were killed in the incident. A bomb in the lavatory was the suspected cause of the incident.

References 

Aviation accidents and incidents in the Philippines
Aviation accidents and incidents in 1970
215
Airliner bombings
Mass murder in 1970
Accidents and incidents involving the Hawker Siddeley HS 748
1970 in the Philippines
April 1970 events in Asia
1970 disasters in the Philippines